Sgùrr Mòr is the highest of the nine Munros in the mountain range known as the Fannichs in northern Scotland. This range is located between Loch Fannich and the A835 Ullapool road — a remote area with few habitations, but these Munros, which are usually climbed in groups or occasionally in a single hike, are mostly gentle sloped and fairly accessible from either of these locations. If approached from Loch Fannich, a bicycle or permission to drive on the private road would be helpful.

Footnotes

See also 
 Ben Nevis
 List of Munro mountains
 Mountains and hills of Scotland

External links

 Sgurr Mòr (Fannichs) is at coordinates 

Marilyns of Scotland
Munros
Mountains and hills of the Northwest Highlands
One-thousanders of Scotland